The Imbaú River is a river of Paraná state in southern Brazil. It flows through Paraná over a distance of about 112 kilometers.

See also
List of rivers of Paraná

References

Brazilian Ministry of Transport

Rivers of Paraná (state)
Imbaú